This article includes the world record progression for the 4×200 metres freestyle relay, and it shows the chronological history of world record times in that competitive swimming event.  The 4×200 metres freestyle relay is a relay event in which each of four swimmers on a team swims a 200-metre freestyle leg in sequence.  The world records are recognized by and maintained by FINA ("Fédération Internationale de Natation"), the international competitive swimming and aquatics federation that oversees the sport in international competition.

World records in swimming were first recognized by FINA in 1908.  The long course (50-metre pool) world records are historically older than the short course (25-metre pool) records.  FINA amended its regulations governing the recognition of world records in 1956; specifically, FINA mandated that only record times that were contested in 50-metre (or 55-yard) pools were eligible for recognition after that time. The short-course world records have been separately recognized since 1991.

The men's 4×200-metre event was first contested at 1908 Summer Olympics in London, but the women's 4×200-metre event didn't appear until the 1996 Summer Olympics in Atlanta.  Prior to 1996, the shorter 4×100-metre freestyle relay was the only women's freestyle relay event staged.

Men

Long course

|-
| align="center"| 47
| align="right"| 7:11.95 
|
|  (1:49.55) Dmitry Lepikov  (1:46.58) Vladimir Pyshnenko  (1:48.99) Veniamin Tayanovich  (1:46.83) Yevgeny Sadovyi
|
|
|Olympic Games
|Barcelona, Spain
|align="center"|
|-

Short course

Women

Long course

|-

Short course

|-
| 1
|align=right| 7:58.74
|
| ?
| ?
| 198_?
| ?
|
|
|-

|-

|-

|-

|-

|-

|-

All-time top 10 by country

Men long course
Correct as of 3 July 2022

Men short course
Correct as of December 2022

Women long course
Correct as of July 2022

Women short course
Correct as of December 2022

Mixed long course
Correct as of August 2022

All-time top 25

Men long course
Correct as of June 2022

Men short course
Correct as of December 2022

Women long course
Correct as of December 2021

Women short course
Correct as of December 2022

Mixed long course
Correct as of August 2022

References

Freestyle relay 4x200 metres
4 × 200 metre freestyle relay